The Lord Rector of the University of St Andrews is the president of the University Court of the University of St Andrews; the University Court is the supreme governing body of the University.

Overview
The Rector is elected every three years by the matriculated students of the University. The current office of Rector, sometimes termed Lord Rector, was instituted by the Universities (Scotland) Act 1858, passed by the Parliament of the United Kingdom. The Universities (Scotland) Acts regulate the governance of the ancient universities of Scotland, and require the election of a Rector for the universities of Aberdeen, Edinburgh, Glasgow, and St Andrews.

Since 1970 the Rector has appointed a student as Rector's Assessor, who is a full voting member of the University Court, and also serves as a member of the students' representative council. As of February 2021 the Rector's Assessor was Stella Maris.

To this day it is only the four ancient universities of Scotland: University of St Andrews, University of Glasgow, University of Aberdeen, and University of Edinburgh, as well as the University of Dundee, that elect a rector, whereas modern universities do not.

List of rectors

See also
 Governance of the University of St Andrews
 Chancellor of the University of St Andrews
 Principal of the University of St Andrews

References

External links
The Rector of the University of St Andrews

St Andrews, Rector of University